KERP (96.3 FM, "96.3 The Marshal") is a radio station broadcasting a country music format. Licensed to Ingalls, Kansas, United States, the station serves the Southwest Kansas area. The station is currently owned by Rocking M Media, LLC.

References

External links
 96.3 The Marshal Online
 

ERP
Radio stations established in 2003